Snakeskin is a 2001 New Zealand road thriller film directed by Gillian Ashurst. The story focuses on Alice (Melanie Lynskey) and her best friend Johnny (Dean O'Gorman), who embark on a road trip across New Zealand. Along the way they pick up an American hitchhiker named Seth (Boyd Kestner), who is on the run from a gang of skinheads (led by Oliver Driver) and a group of drug dealers. 

Snakeskin screened at the 54th Cannes Film Festival, before opening in New Zealand cinemas on 11 October 2001. Critics praised its production values and acting, with Variety calling Lynskey's performance "excellent". The film won six New Zealand Film Awards in 2001. It has never had an official release in the US or the UK, but has played on television in both territories.

Cast 
 Melanie Lynskey – Alice
 Boyd Kestner – Seth
 Dean O'Gorman – Johnny
 Oliver Driver – Speed
 Paul Glover – Terry
 Charlie Bleakley – Owen
 Gordon Hatfield – Tama
 Taika Waititi – Nelson 
 Jodie Rimmer – Daisy
 Jacob Tomuri – Robbie

Awards 
 2002 AFI Los Angeles Film Festival – Nominee for Grand Jury Prize
 2001 New Zealand Film Awards (Wins)
  Best Film
  Best Cinematography
  Best Computer Generated Images
  Best Editing
  Best Original Music (Joost Langeveld and Leyton)
  Best Contribution to a Soundtrack (Dave Whitehead)
  Also nominated for: Best Actress (Lynskey), Best Director, Best Screenplay, Best Makeup, Best Supporting Actor (Glover)

External links

References 

New Zealand thriller films
2001 films
2000s thriller films
2000s road movies
2000s English-language films
Films shot in New Zealand